Sheila Ellen Natusch  (née Traill, 14 February 1926 – 10 August 2017) was a New Zealand writer and freelance illustrator. Many of her books cover natural history and the history of southern New Zealand, particularly Stewart Island.

Early life and family
Born Sheila Ellen Traill in Invercargill on 14 February 1926, Natusch was the daughter of Robert Henry "Roy" Traill, whose father had emigrated to New Zealand from Orkney, and Michigan-born Dorothea Ellen Traill (née Moseley). Through her father, Natusch was the great-granddaughter of Eliza Wohlers and her husband, German missionary Johan Wohlers. She grew up on Stewart Island, where her father was the wildlife ranger for 33 years, and received her secondary education at Southland Girls' High School. She then studied at Dunedin Teachers' Training College where she met and befriended Janet Frame. The two became life long friends; in fact Natusch was the first person to read Frame's manuscript for Owls Do Cry. Later she studied at the University of Otago, graduating Bachelor of Arts in 1948 and Master of Arts with second-class honours in 1949. In 1950, she married Gilbert Gardner Natusch, a hydro-engineer, and the couple lived in Wellington.

Professional life 
Natusch wrote, illustrated or compiled over 77 books for adults and children. In the 2007 New Year Honours, Natusch was appointed a Member of the New Zealand Order of Merit for services as a writer and illustrator.

A documentary about Natusch's life, No Ordinary Sheila, by her cousin New Zealand director Hugh Macdonald, featured in the 2017 New Zealand International Film Festival.

Natusch died in Wellington on 10 August 2017.

In 2017, Natusch was selected as one of the Royal Society Te Apārangi's "150 women in 150 words", celebrating women's contributions to knowledge in New Zealand.

Selected works 

 Native plants : an introduction to the plant life of New Zealand by Sheila Natusch. Christchurch, N.Z. : Pegasus, 1956
 Native rock by Sheila Natusch. Wellington N.Z. : Reed, 1959/1967
 Stewart Island by N.S. Seaward and Sheila Natusch. Christchurch, N.Z. : Pegasus, 1962
 Animals of New Zealand by Sheila Natusch. Christchurch, Whitcombe & Tombs, 1967
 A bunch of wild orchids by Sheila Natusch. Christchurch, N.Z. : Pegasus, 1968
 Hell and high water : a German occupation of the Chatham Islands, 1843-1910 by Sheila Natusch. Christchurch, N.Z. : Pegasus, c1977
An island called home by Sheila Natusch. Invercargill, N.Z. : Craig Printing Co., 1992 9780908629381  Letters from Jean edited by Sheila Natusch. (by Janet Frame). Wellington N.Z. : Nestegg Books, 2004
 So far so good : an autobiography by Sheila Natusch. Wellington, N.Z. : Nestegg, 2007

References

External links
 A collection of Radio New Zealand programmes on Sheila Natusch 

1926 births
2017 deaths
People from Invercargill
New Zealand people of German descent
New Zealand people of Scottish descent
New Zealand people of American descent
New Zealand people of English descent
People educated at Southland Girls' High School
University of Otago alumni
New Zealand scientists
New Zealand non-fiction writers
20th-century New Zealand women writers
21st-century New Zealand women writers
Members of the New Zealand Order of Merit
New Zealand autobiographers